Eric Ian Spoutz (born August 3, 1983) is an American art dealer, historian and museum curator. Spoutz has owned art galleries in Detroit, Michigan, Cape Coral, Florida, Palm Beach, Florida, and Los Angeles, California.

Early life and family
Spoutz was born in Mount Clemens, Michigan on August 3, 1983, to Carl Spoutz, a real estate developer and Rosemary Hornak, an artist. Eric Ian Spoutz's maternal uncle and namesake was the founding Hyperrealist and Photorealist artist, Ian Hornak. Ian Hornak's life partner was Julius Rosenthal Wolf, who was a prominent American casting director, producer, theatrical agent, art collector, art dealer, and the vice president of General Amusement Corporation, then the second largest talent management agency in the world. During the 1950s and 1960s, Wolf had been the assistant director of Edith Halpert's Downtown Gallery in New York City where he became a champion of American Modernism in the visual arts.

Spoutz's parents divorced in 1993 when he was 9 years old. He was raised by his mother, his father's parents and his uncle, Ian Hornak. During the school year he lived in Mount Clemens, Michigan and many summers, and holidays he spent with Ian Hornak at his home and studio in East Hampton, New York and in New York City.

Through his early exposure to the art world in New York, Spoutz took an interest in art and became his uncle's studio manager in East Hampton at age 16. Elmer Spoutz, Eric Spoutz's paternal grandfather who was a real estate developer and businessman, died when Eric Spoutz was 18 in 2002 and he became the trustee of his grandfather's estate. Later in 2002 when Spoutz was 19, his uncle Ian Hornak died and Spoutz became the executor of his estate.

Education
Spoutz graduated from Cardinal Mooney Catholic College Preparatory School in 2001. He graduated with a Bachelor of General Studies degree with concentrations in General Business & Historical Studies from Fort Hays State University. As of 2022, he is a graduate student at Rutgers University where he is pursuing a Master of Arts degree in Creative Arts and Literature.

Career
In 2003, Spoutz opened the Eric I. Spoutz Gallery in the Fisher Building in Detroit, Michigan which specialized in photorealist and hyperrealist artwork. He curated, "Lowell Nesbitt: A Retrospective" there in 2004, which was the largest display of the artist's artwork since the artist's death in 1993. Later Spoutz moved to Palm Beach, Florida where he lived in a beachfront penthouse until moving back to Michigan in 2008.

Between 2007 and 2017, Spoutz placed artwork by many artists into the permanent collections of the Smithsonian American Art Museum, the Smithsonian Institution's National Museum of American History, the Smithsonian Institution's Archives of American Art, the Smithsonian Libraries, the Library of Congress Prints and Photographs Division, the Library of Congress Rare Books and Special Collections Division, the Board of Governors of the Federal Reserve System, the National Museum of Women in the Arts, the National Hellenic Museum, the National Czech & Slovak Museum & Library, the Florida State Capitol, the Academy of Motion Picture Arts and Sciences, the Los Angeles County Museum, the Museum of Fine Arts, Boston, the Detroit Institute of Arts, Dartmouth College's Rauner Special Collections Library, the Zimmerli Art Museum at Rutgers University, The George Washington University Art Galleries, The Kinsey Institute for Research in Sex, Gender and Reproduction, the Forest Lawn Museum, the Long Island Museum of American Art, History, and Carriages, the Flint Institute of Arts, the Boston Children's Hospital, the Children's Hospital of Philadelphia, the Detroit Historical Museum and the Rock and Roll Hall of Fame and Museum. Spoutz also curated traveling museum exhibitions throughout the United States including an exhibition at Federal Reserve Board of Governors in Washington D.C. that was on display during Barack Obama's 2013 Presidential Inauguration sponsored by Ben Bernanke, the Washington County Museum of Fine Arts, the Kinsey Institute, and the Anton Art Center.

During the City of Detroit bankruptcy, Spoutz was quoted as an art expert in The Detroit News, valuing the Detroit Institute of Arts collection and public art in the City of Detroit including Marshall Fredericks sculpture, Spirit of Detroit, and the Robert Graham (sculptor) sculpture, Monument to Joe Louis.

Spoutz opened Gallery 928 at The Westin Cape Coral Resort at Marina Village in Cape Coral, Florida where he exhibited the artwork of contemporary artists and masterworks by Andy Warhol, Joan Miró, Pablo Picasso and others, at one time reportedly having 20 million dollars with of artwork on display. The gallery closed in 2014 and Spoutz moved to Los Angeles, California where he opened an online dealership for authentic masterworks.

He also volunteered as a curator for The Heidelberg Project in Detroit, Michigan, The Connecticut Cancer Foundation in Old Saybrook, Connecticut and the estate of Jack Mitchell (photographer).

Personal
Spoutz married Natasha Gavroski in Beverly Hills, California in 2012; they divorced in April 2018.

Legal
On February 3, 2016, Eric Spoutz was arrested at his penthouse in Hollywood, Los Angeles, California based upon a 26-page criminal complaint issued by the office of United States Attorney for the Southern District of New York, Preet Bharara. On June 3, 2016, Spoutz pled guilty in the case of US v. Spoutz to one count of wire fraud related to the sale of falsely attributed artwork accompanied by forged provenance documents. The government charged Spoutz with marketing and selling the fraudulent artwork through online auction sites and auction houses. The criminal case did not relate to Spoutz's legitimate art galleries that he owned, the artwork that he put into museum collections or the artwork by his uncle, Ian Hornak. Dozens of character letters from Spoutz's friends, family, colleagues and clients written on his behalf begging for leniency were presented to the court including letters from former New York Yankees, Texas Rangers and Cleveland Indians baseball player, John Ellis, American lyrical abstraction co-founder Ronnie Landfield, New York artist, Scott Kahn and the executive director of The Heidelberg Project. On February 16, 2017, Spoutz was sentenced by the Honorable Lewis A. Kaplan in United States District Court for the Southern District of New York to 41 months in federal prison at Federal Correctional Institution, Morgantown and ordered to forfeit the $1.45 million he made from the scheme and pay $154,100 in restitution.

References

External links

1983 births
People from Mount Clemens, Michigan
American art dealers
American art historians
American art curators
American fraudsters
21st-century American criminals
Living people
Historians from Michigan